"Famine, Affluence, and Morality" is an essay written by Peter Singer in 1971 and published in Philosophy & Public Affairs in 1972. It argues that affluent persons are morally obligated to donate far more resources to humanitarian causes than is considered normal in Western cultures. The essay was inspired by the starvation of Bangladesh Liberation War refugees, and uses their situation as an example, although Singer's argument is general in scope and not limited to the example of Bangladesh. The essay is anthologized widely as an example of Western ethical thinking.

Summary 
One of the core arguments of this essay is that, if one can use one's wealth to reduce suffering—for example, by aiding famine-relief efforts—without any significant reduction in the well-being of oneself or others, it is immoral not to do so. Singer introduces the "drowning child" argument or drowning child analogy: According to Singer, inaction is clearly immoral if a child is drowning in a shallow pond and someone can save it but chooses not to; nor does placing greater geographical distance between the person in need and the potential helper reduce the latter's moral obligations:

It makes no moral difference whether the person I can help is a neighbor's child ten yards away from me or a Bengali whose name I shall never know, ten thousand miles away. ... The moral point of view requires us to look beyond the interests of our own society. Previously, ... this may hardly have been feasible, but it is quite feasible now. From the moral point of view, the prevention of the starvation of millions of people outside our society must be considered at least as pressing as the upholding of property norms within our society.

The affluent, says Singer, are consistently guilty of failing to recognize this, having large amounts of surplus wealth that they do not use to aid humanitarian projects in developing nations.

Here is the thrust of Singer's argument:

"Suffering and death from lack of food, shelter and medical care are bad".
"If it is in our power to prevent something bad from happening, without thereby sacrificing anything of comparable moral importance, then we ought, morally, to do it".
"It makes no moral difference whether the person I can help is a neighbor's child ten yards from me or a Bengali whose name I shall never know, ten thousand miles away".
"The principle makes no distinction between cases in which I am the only person who could possibly do anything and cases in which I am just one among millions in the same position".

Reception and criticism
Philosopher Gilbert Harman considered "Famine, Affluence, and Morality" to be one of the most famous articles in ethics. In 1981, philosopher James Rachels said of the article: "one felt intellectual interest in the argument, but also guilt for not having contributed more money to relieve starvation".

Singer's article inspired the writing of Peter Unger's 1996 book Living High and Letting Die.

Philosopher William MacAskill was influenced by the essay, which he encountered in an undergraduate seminar; MacAskill later went on to be a founder of the effective altruism movement. In 2015, The New Republic noted the influence of Singer's essay on effective altruism.

The "drowning child" analogy informs the title of the 2015 book Strangers Drowning by Larissa MacFarquhar, which documents the lives of various extreme altruists, some of whom were influenced by Singer's essay.

A common criticism of Singer's essay is the demandingness objection. For example, the "supposed obligation" of Singer's essay has been criticised by John Arthur, by John Kekes, and by Kwame Anthony Appiah, and Singer's claim of a straight path from commonsense morality to great giving has also been disputed.

Quotations 

"[N]either our distance from a preventable evil nor the number of other people who, in respect to that evil, are in the same situation as we are, lessens our obligation to mitigate or prevent that evil."
 "[I]f it is in our power to prevent something bad from happening, without thereby sacrificing anything of comparable moral importance, we ought, morally, to do it." This, according to Singer, is a qualified reassertion of the principle that governs his argument.
 "People do not feel in any way ashamed or guilty about spending money on new clothes or a new car instead of giving it to famine relief. (Indeed, the alternative does not occur to them.) This way of looking at the matter cannot be justified. When we buy new clothes not to keep ourselves warm but to look 'well-dressed' we are not providing for any important need."

See also 
 Bangladesh famine of 1974
 Lockean proviso
 Doing Good Better by William MacAskill, 2015
 The Life You Can Save by Peter Singer, 2009

Notes

References 
 
  With a foreword by Bill and Melinda Gates and a new preface and two extra essays by Singer.

External links 
 
 Study Guide: Peter Singer’s ‘Famine, Affluence, and Morality’ in Introduction to Utilitarianism: An Online Textbook
 
 
  (2014), song about the "drowning child" analogy

Philosophy essays
1971 essays
Essays about effective altruism
Works originally published in American magazines
Peter Singer